Heribert Macherey (born 3 November 1954) is a German former footballer who played as a goalkeeper. He became the second goalkeeper after Dirk Krüssenberg to keep a clean sheet in his three first Bundesliga games.

References

External links
 

1954 births
Living people
Sportspeople from Oberhausen
German footballers
Footballers from North Rhine-Westphalia
Association football goalkeepers
MSV Duisburg players
Bundesliga players
2. Bundesliga players